This is a list of bridges and viaducts in Switzerland, including those for pedestrians and vehicular traffic.

Historical and architectural interest bridges

Major road and railway bridges 

The Grimselsee Bridge is part of the "KWO plus" project which consists to raise by  the water level of the Grimsel Lake, to increase the power capacity of the two Spittellamm and Seeuferegg damns. The part of the road between Guttannen and Obergoms flooded by the project will be span by a  cable-stayed bridge, to restore the continuity across the lake.

In 2021 a competition was organized to choose the project for the Plessur river valley crossing near Chur in the Grisons canton, in order to relieve the road traffic of the city center.

This table presents the structures with spans greater than 100 meters (non-exhaustive list).

Major footbridges

Notes and references 
 Notes

 

 

 

 Others references

See also 

 Transport in Switzerland
 Motorways of Switzerland
 Rail transport in Switzerland
 Geography of Switzerland
 List of rivers of Switzerland
 List of Aare bridges in Bern
 List of bridges over the Rhine
 :de:Liste der gedeckten Brücken in der Schweiz  - List of covered bridges in Switzerland
 :de:Liste der höchsten Brücken in der Schweiz  - List of highest bridges in Switzerland
 List of bridges by river: de:Albula, de:Alpenrhein, de:Areuse, de:Birs, de:Dünnern, de:Engelberger Aa, de:Ergolz, de:Furkareuss, de:Glâne, de:Glatt (Rhein), de:Glatt (Thur), de:Glenner, de:Julia, de:Kleine Emme, de:Landquart, de:Landwasser, de:Limmat, de:Linth, de:Alte Lorze, de:Lorze, de:Medelser Rhein, de:Mentue, de:Muota, de:Murg (Thur), de:Necker, de:Plessur, de:Rabiusa, de:Reuss, de:Seez, de:Sense, de:Sihl, de:Sitter, de:Sorne, de:Suhre, de:Tamina, de:Thur, de:Töss, de:Valser Rhein, de:Vorderrhein, de:Waldemme, de:Weissemme, de:Wigger, de:Wyna, de:Zürichsee

External links

Further reading 
 
 
 
 
 
 
 
 

Switzerland
 
Bridges
Bridges